Donakonda railway station (station code: DKD), is located in Prakasam district of Andhra Pradesh, India, and serves Donakonda.

Structure and amenities 
The station has rooftop solar panels installed by the Indian Railways, along with various railway stations and service buildings in the country, as a part of sourcing 500 MW solar energy.

References

External links 

Railway stations in Prakasam district